X-ray telescopes are designed to observe the x-ray region of the electromagnetic spectrum. X-rays from outer space cannot be observed from the ground due to absorption by the atmosphere, and so x-ray telescopes must be launched into orbit. Their mirrors require a very low angle of reflection (typically 10 arc-minutes to 2 degrees).  These are called glancing (or grazing) incidence mirrors.  In 1952, Hans Wolter outlined three ways a telescope could be built using only this kind of mirror.

Space-borne observatories and instruments
This list contains space-borne observatories as well as X-ray instruments as part of a larger mission, both past, present and in the proposal stage.

High-altitude atmospheric observatories and instruments
Sometimes X-Ray observations are made from a near-space environment on sounding rockets or high-altitude balloons.

Normal Incidence X-ray Telescope (series of sounding rocket payloads, flown in the late 1980s and 1990s)
Multi-spectral solar telescope array (MSSTA) (series of sounding rocket payloads, flown in the 1990s and early 2000s)
Polarised Gamma-ray Observer (PoGOLite) (balloon-borne astroparticle physics experiment, flown 2011-2013)

Gallery

See also
List of telescope types
Lists of telescopes
Calorimetric Electron Telescope (telescope type)
Cosmic-ray observatory (mission type)
Phase-contrast X-ray imaging (general term)
Wolter telescope (telescope type)
X-ray astronomy satellite (mission type)
X-ray spectroscopy (general term)
Lists of spacecraft

References

External links
Comparison with of X-ray satellites
Comparison of XMM-Newton EPIC, Chandra ACIS-S3, ASCA SIS and GIS, and ROSAT PSPC Results for G21.5-0.9, 1E0102.2-7219, and MS1-54.4-0321

X-ray
X-ray